Dak-ttongjip, literally "chicken gizzard", is a Korean dish made by stir-frying chicken gizzard with spices. It is a popular anju (accompaniment to alcoholic drinks). The dish can also be called dak-ttongjip-bokkeum, as it is a bokkeum (stir-fried dish).

Etymology and translations 
Dak-ttongjip is a vernacular term for "chicken gizzard", with its components dak meaning "chicken", and ttongjip normally meaning "big intestine" or "stomach". However, as ttong and jip can be (mistakenly) parsed as "waste" and "house" respectively, mistranslations such as "chicken poo house" or "chicken asshole house" are not uncommon.

History 
In 1972, dak-ttongjip was a giveaway side dish for day laborers visiting Sama Tongdak, a fried chicken restaurant at Pyeonghwa Market in Daegu. Due to its positive reception, it became a regular menu item. Soon, it became the most popular food at Pyeonghwa Market, where there is a "dak-ttongjip alley" today. Dak-ttongjip is now considered the local specialty of Daegu.

References 

South Korean chicken dishes
Offal